Silvano Ippoliti (24 January 1922 – 1994) was an Italian cinematographer.

Born in Cagli, Ippoliti entered the cinema industry thanks to his sister Iria, employed at Cinecittà, who introduced him to Anchise Brizzi, at the time the chief of the operators department. He began working as a camera operator in 1949 for the Raffaello Matarazzo's film Catene, then held this role for over a decade. He made his debut as a cinematographer in the early sixties and in 1967 he worked for the first time with Tinto Brass in the film Col cuore in gola; it was the beginning of a long professional relationship that lasted for twenty-five years, both in the fields of cinema and advertising, until the 1992 film Così fan tutte. His credits include also films directed by Giuliano Montaldo, Luigi Magni, Jacques Deray, Carlo Lizzani, Sergio Corbucci, Pasquale Festa Campanile, Lucio Fulci, Riccardo Freda and Emidio Greco.

References

External links 
 

1922 births
1994 deaths
Italian cinematographers
People from the Province of Pesaro and Urbino